Andriy Kyforenko ( or Andrei Kiforenko from , born 7 September 1980) is a Ukrainian former competitive figure skater. He won gold at the 1998 ISU Junior Grand Prix in Ukraine and competed at two World Junior Championships, finishing in the top ten in 2000.

After retiring from competition, Kyforenko skated professionally as a principal performer in ice shows. Kyforenko coached in Ukraine & England. He now works as a coach in Charlotte, North Carolina.  He is Co-Head coach of Elite Skating Academy.  Kyforenko has coached several international athletes and US National competitors:  Kaylee Dobson and Emily Zhang among others. Kyforenko holds a bachelor's degree in “Olympic & Professional Sport”

Competitive highlights 
JGP: Junior Grand Prix

References 

1980 births
Ukrainian male single skaters
Living people
Sportspeople from Odesa
Ukrainian emigrants to the United States